Arch Hill is a small suburb of Auckland, New Zealand.  Arch Hill is under the local governance of the Auckland Council. The area is called Arch Hill due to its "natural features".

Demographics
Arch Hill is covered by the Grey Lynn East and the Karangahape statistical areas, but these also include areas outside this suburb.

History 

In  1730 this may have been the site of the "Broken Calabash [Attack]": Te Ipu Pakore. This battle between two warring Maori tribes probably happened along this ridge, possibly around the Arch Hill area.

In the 1880s this was part of an 80-acre farm which stretched from what is now Great North Road, down the gulley where the North Western Motorway cuts through, and up the other side to the Morningside area. It was owned by Joseph and Jane Young who had arrived in Auckland in 1842, the farm was called 'Arch Hill', after the farm Joseph had been raised on near Strabane, County Londonderry, Ireland. Joseph died in 1880 on his Arch Hill' property at the age of 78. In 1885 their son, Joseph built a house called Breveg Villa (Jane's maiden name was Breveg) which is located at 47 Western Springs Road, which is now separated from Arch Hill by the 1960s motorway.

Most of the houses on the Arch Hill area date from around the turn of the 20th century and many are small workers cottages or wooden villas; sections are often tiny and without off-street parking. As Arch Hill faces south away from the sun it is and always was a less desirable location than either neighbouring Grey Lynn or Kingsland. Some light industrial commercial premises have replaced parts of the housing stock with one & two storey commercial properties and more recently apartment complexes have been built.

Before the north-western motorway was cut through the bottom of the suburb, known as Arch Hill Gully, in the 1960s and 70s, many of the streets running down from Great North Road linked up with those in Kingsland. Now the only through road is Bond Street, the others have become quiet cul-de-sacs.

The Arch Hill Roads Board was formed after the Provincial abolition of the 1870s and was an independent municipality until it was incorporated into the City of Auckland in the 1910s following a referendum.  The Arch Hill electorate was created for the 1946 elections, formed out of portions of the Auckland Central, Auckland West, and Grey Lynn electorates.

The Arch Hill Hotel was a landmark on the corner of Great North Road and Tuarangi Road at what is now the Surrey Crescent shops.  Built in the 19th century it still stands on its original site although in a modified state. It closed around 1900 when the residents of the area voted to go dry in a  referendum. As the Old Stone Jug Pub at Western Springs no longer operated this resulted in there being no pubs between the Gluepot at Three lamps, The Star at the corner of Krd & Ponsonby Road and the Avondale Hotel.

Education 
The local secondary schools are Western Springs College, Mount Albert Grammar School, St Paul's College and St Mary's College.

References

External links 
Photographs of Arch Hill held in Auckland Libraries' heritage collections.

Suburbs of Auckland
Waitematā Local Board Area